Antar Osmani (born 22 February 1960) is a former Algerian football goalkeeper.

An Algerian international from 1989 to 1992, he was a member of the Algeria national football team that won the 1990 African Cup of Nations and the 1991 Afro-Asian Cup of Nations. He was also a member of the Algeria under-20 national team that won the 1979 African Youth Championship.

Honours

Club
 ES Sétif
 Algerian Championnat National: 1986–87
 African Cup of Champions Clubs: 1988
 Afro-Asian Club Championship: 1989
 Algerian Cup: 1989

Country
 Algeria U20
 African Youth Championship: 1979
 Algeria
 Africa Cup of Nations: 1990
 Afro-Asian Cup of Nations: 1991

Individual 
 Africa Cup of Nations Team of the Tournament:1990

References

External links
 FIFA Profile

1960 births
Footballers from Sétif
1990 African Cup of Nations players
1992 African Cup of Nations players
Algeria international footballers
Algeria youth international footballers
Algerian footballers
ES Sétif players
USM Bel Abbès players
Africa Cup of Nations-winning players
Living people
Association football goalkeepers
21st-century Algerian people